The Jerusalem Declaration on Antisemitism (JDA) is a document meant to outline the bounds of antisemitic speech and conduct, particularly with regard to Zionism, Israel and Palestine. Its creation was motivated by a desire to confront antisemitism and by objections to the IHRA Definition of Antisemitism, which critics have said stifles legitimate criticism of the Israeli government and curbs free speech. The drafting of the declaration was initiated in June 2020 under the auspices of the Van Leer Institute in Jerusalem by eight coordinators, most of whom were university professors. Upon its completion the declaration was signed by about 200 scholars in various fields and released in March 2021.

The declaration includes a 16-word definition of antisemitism which reads:

It also includes 15 guidelines, divided into three sections, that seek to aid in the identification of antisemitism and give examples of antisemitic speech and conduct with regard to Israel and Palestine that are and are not antisemitic.

The declaration was positively received by a cohort of Democratic members of the U.S. House of Representatives who urged the U.S. State Department to use it alongside the IHRA definition. However, in its response to the Representatives the State Department reaffirmed its support for the IHRA definition and ultimately did not take steps to adopt the JDA. 

The declaration has also been criticized on multiple fronts. Some have said that by seeking to rebut the IHRA definition the JDA undermines consensus and sets back the fight against antisemitism. The declaration has also been criticized for sidelining the issue of antisemitism by seeking to engulf it in the fight against all other forms of racism. Others have questioned the reputability of the declaration given that a number of its signers have been accused of antisemitism.



Creation

Purpose 
According to the document's preamble, The Jerusalem Declaration on Antisemitism was created in order to clarify the "limits of legitimate political speech and action concerning Zionism, Israel, and Palestine", and to be used by those seeking to identify and oppose antisemitism. It does so through its definition of antisemitism and by providing guidelines intended to characterize distinctions between antisemitic speech and legitimate criticism of Israel. Its creators intended for it to be used as an alternative or supplement to the IHRA definition.

Coordinators 
The Jerusalem Declaration was coordinated and authored by an eight-member group that included seven academics and a journalist/filmmaker. The group consisted of two Britons, three Germans, two Israelis and an American.

Drafting and signing 

The declaration's coordinators began drafting the document online in June 2020, and the declaration was publicly released on March 25, 2021, nine months later. Following its completion, the declaration was signed by about 200 scholars in various fields including Jewish studies, Israel studies, Middle Eastern studies, comparative literature, and sociology.

Name 
The declaration is called the "Jerusalem Declaration" because it was created under the auspices of the Van Leer Institute in Jerusalem. The group that drafted its text also intended to do so in Jerusalem but could not as a result of the COVID-19 pandemic.

Guidelines 
The declaration's 15 guidelines are divided into three sections. Section A deals with general manifestations of antisemitism and provides examples like Holocaust denial and the Rothschild conspiracy theory. Section B gives examples of speech and conduct relating to Israel and Palestine that are inherently antisemitic according to the authors, including holding Jews collectively responsible for Israel's actions or requiring Jews to disavow Israel or Zionism. Section C gives examples of speech and conduct with regard to Israel and Palestine that are not necessarily antisemitic according to its authors, including supporting Palestinians, double standards against Israel and anti-Zionism. 

The declaration does not take explicit stances for or against the Boycott, Divestment and Sanctions (BDS) movement or the one-state solution, but rules they are not antisemitic "on the face of it."

Reception

US State Department 
In April 2021, several Democrats in the U.S. House of Representatives led by Representative Jan Schakowsky wrote a letter to United States Secretary of State Antony Blinken urging him to make use of tools against antisemitism beyond the IHRA definition, including the Jerusalem Declaration and Nexus Document. Organizations including Americans for Peace Now and J Street supported the letter while the Anti-Defamation League (ADL) and American Jewish Committee (AJC) opposed it.

Responding to the letter, Acting Assistant Secretary Naz Durakoğlu said "the Biden Administration embraces and champions the IHRA nonlegally binding working definition of anti-Semitism in its entirety, including its examples, and the Administration continues to encourage other countries as well as international bodies to do the same." The State Department did not directly address the Jerusalem Declaration in its response.

Criticism 
In an April 2021 opinion article in The Jewish Chronicle, David Hirsh, a lecturer in sociology at Goldsmiths University of London, criticized the Jerusalem Declaration on the grounds that it "does not help the fight against antisemitism", and has a blind spot for antisemitism that originates on the political left. The JDA, he wrote, is flawed because it "asks institutions to affirm that BDS ... singling out Israel as uniquely colonial or apartheid, and saying that Israel has no right to exist, are not, 'in and of themselves', antisemitic", when, according to Hirsh, those things "are at the heart of contemporary left antisemitism".

In an April 2021 opinion article in Al Jazeera, Mark Muhannad Ayyash, an associate professor at Mount Royal University criticized the Jerusalem Declaration, saying it was "an orientalist text that fails to produce true opposition to the core problem of the IHRA definition: the silencing and erasure of Palestine and Palestinians". He also said the declaration presents Palestinians as "hostile, reactionary, and emotional", and that "there is very little substantive difference between [the Jerusalem Declaration's 10th] guideline and the IHRA definition's claim that arguing that Israel is a racist endeavour constitutes antisemitism".

In an April 2021 article in The National Interest, Gerald Steinberg and Asaf Romirowsky said that the Jerusalem Declaration legitimizes increasing violence against Jews and their institutions by politicizing and attempting to undermine efforts to reach a consensus on antisemitism. The authors criticized the declaration for its extensive use of "weasel words" like "on the face of it" and "in and of itself/themselves", which they said obscures the fact that arguments are often reinterpreted in different contexts and take on meaning beyond that of the words used to express them. The authors also claimed the Jerusalem Declaration "marginalizes the core issues of antisemitism" by subordinating it to the fight against all other forms of discrimination.

In an April 2021 essay in Fathom Journal, Cary Nelson, former president of the American Association of University Professors, criticized the Jerusalem Declaration on the basis that it seeks to accommodate manifestations of "new antisemitism" rather than challenge them. Nelson said the declaration's preamble is dismissive of the ways that antisemitism has stood apart from other forms of racism historically and how that history has shaped Jewish identity. He also said the declaration makes generalizations about antisemitism that do not apply under many circumstances, like claiming that the hallmark of classic antisemitism is "the idea that Jews are linked to the forces of evil". Nelson also said that many amongst the signers of the declaration are "fierce and uncompromising anti-Zionists who cross a line into antisemitism", including Sergio Luzzatto, a historian at the University of Connecticut who believes the medieval blood libel was true.

In an April 2021 op-ed in Haaretz, David Schraub, a law professor at the Lewis & Clark School, criticized the Jerusalem Declaration's framing of some forms of speech and conduct as not antisemitic "in and of themselves". According to Schraub this framing has resulted in the "JDA ... being interpreted almost solely as a tool for denying things are antisemitic". He said as a result the JDA has been embraced by those whose main concern about antisemitism is that "we hear too much about it" and whose own conduct could be labeled antisemitic by the declaration. Schraub gave the examples of Richard Falk, a 9/11 truther and signer of the declaration, and Yvonne Ridley, who endorsed the declaration and once said "the Zionists have tentacles everywhere".

In a July 2021 essay in Mosaic, Joshua Muravchik, a professor at the Institute of World Politics, criticized the Jerusalem Declaration for seeking to contextualize antisemitism within a broader fight against all other forms of discrimination because that framing ignores that Jews are often discriminated against by other minorities. He claimed that "In asserting, as a rebuke to the IHRA definition, that the struggle against anti-Semitism is inseparable from similar struggles, the JDA seems to be addressing the wrong audience; much of the anti-Semitism that plagues Jews arises from non-majority groups."

Response to criticism 
In Fathom articles from April and May 2021, Michael Walzer, an original signer of the Jerusalem Declaration, responded to criticisms registered against him and the declaration, and reaffirmed his support for the IHRA definition. He conceded that like the IHRA definition, the Jerusalem Declaration can be misinterpreted. He said the organizers of the declaration should have rejected the signatures of the declaration's antisemitic signatories. He also said he had signed the declaration because he "thought that JDA offered to create a little distance, nothing more, between antisemitism and the Israel/Palestine battles" which he said he knows "often overlap". With regard to calls to repeal the IHRA definition in Great Britain, he said that "rescinding IHRA or replacing it with a definition perceived as more permissive would send a very bad message to students and teachers at British universities."

See also 

 New antisemitism
 Three Ds of antisemitism
 Working Definition of Antisemitism

References

External links 

 Official website

Opposition to antisemitism
Definition of antisemitism controversy
2021 documents